Double cone may refer to:

Double cone (geometry)
Double cone (biology)
 The Remarkables Mountain range, in New Zealand